The 2013 Inter-Provincial Hurling Championship, known as the 2013 M Donnelly Hurling Inter-Provincial Championship due to the tournament's sponsorship by businessman Martin Donnelly, was the 84th series of the Inter-provincial Championship. The annual hurling championship between the four historic provinces of Ireland is contested by Connacht, Leinster, Munster and Ulster.

Leinster were the reigning champions but Munster won the title after defeating Connacht in the final by 1-22 to 0-15.

Participants
The teams involved are:

Results

Inter-provincial Championship

Top scorers

Championship

Single game

References

External links
 M Donnelly Interprovincials official website

Railway Cup Hurling Championship
Interprovincial Hurling Championship
Hurling